Curious George is an American children's animated television series based on the children's book series of the same name which features Jeff Bennett as the voice of Ted Shackelford (credited as "The Man with the Yellow Hat", formerly called that in the original series books and telefilm books). Frank Welker, who voiced George in the 2006 feature film, returns as the voice of him. The show premiered on PBS Kids on September 4, 2006, and originally ended after nine seasons on April 1, 2015 before returning in 2018. 

On September 3, 2018, season 10 premiered on Family Jr. in Canada. Seasons 10-13 debuted on NBCUniversal's streaming service Peacock in the United States when it launched in July 2020. Seasons 1-9 of Curious George are available to stream for Peacock Premium subscribers since September 20, 2020, which is also available to stream on Hulu. Season 10 of Curious George premiered on PBS on October 5, 2020.

Curious George is a production of Universal 1440 Entertainment (Universal Studios Family Productions before 2013), Imagine Entertainment, and WGBH-TV (WGBH Kids) (before season 13), and animated by Toon City. Each episode has two animated segments per half hour episode, and a short live-action segment after each.

The live-action shorts illustrate and explain various concepts in math and science, and shows a class with kids engaging in experiments, that teach the math or science concept featured in the previous story. This was shown for seasons 1–9 during its first runs. They were removed from re-runs starting after season 10, and future airings of older episodes also remove them.

Settings
 City: George and the Man live in an apartment in the Big City. The actual name of the city is unknown but has some similarities to New York. However in the episode Curious George Takes a Vacation, an airport worker mentions they're in Illinois meaning they possibly live in Chicago. The Doorman keeps a pigeon coop on the roof and is the guardian of Hundley, his dachshund dog. The apartment is near Endless Park, the museum where Professor Wiseman works, and the zoo. Chef Pisghetti's restaurant is nearby, as are a doughnut shop, Dulson's Toy Store, Mabel's Department Store (a parody of Macy's and its erstwhile competitor Gimbels), the supermarket, and the pet shop. These are recurring locations.
 Country: George and the Man vacation in a small house in the country. The house is near Lake Wanasinklake, a stream, and a river that eventually flows past the city and to the ocean. George is friends there with five-year-old Allie and the teenage paperboy, Bill.

Voice cast

 Frank Welker — Curious George, Tony Pizza, Dumpling Duck, Stig, Flint Quint, Bill's Bunnies, Various characters
 Jeff Bennett — Ted Shackelford (credited as "The Man with the Yellow Hat"), Alvin Einstein, Mr. Renkins, Various characters
 William H. Macy (Season 1)Rino Romano (Season 2–present) — Narrator
 Rob Paulsen — Compass, Charkie, Mr. Glass, Hamilton the Pig, Jagger the Rooster, Blanche the Goat, Mr. Dulson, Mr. Ruffweek, Various characters
 Jim Cummings — Chef Pisghetti, Jumpy Squirrel, Mr. Quint, Rodney, Various characters
 Debi Derryberry — Gnocchi (Season 1), Lucky the Kitten, Mrs. Dulson
 Bill Chott (Season 1)Lex Lang (Season 2–present) — The Doorman, Hundley
 Dee Bradley Baker — Gnocchi (Season 2–present)
 B. J. Ward — Aunt Margaret
 E. G. Daily — Steve, Andie, Various characters
 Grey DeLisle — Betsy, Marco, Dorothy, Molly Zucchini, Various characters
 Susan Silo — Netti Pisghetti
 Lara Jill Miller — Allie
 Kevin Michael Richardson — Dr. Baker, Toots, Stew, Various characters
 James Taylor — Leo Zucchini
 Tara Strong — Claire Zucchini, Various characters
 Carlos Alazraqui — Mr. Zoobel
 Jess Harnell — Dinwoodie
 Amber Hood — Carla
 Annie Mumolo — Bill
 Rolonda Watts — Professor Wiseman
 Kath Soucie — Mrs. Renkins

Episodes

The setting for most episodes is either the city, where George lives in an apartment building with the Man in the Yellow Hat, or the country, where they share a small house near a lake called Lake Wanasinklake. This allows George to mirror the experiences of kids who live in an urban environment and those who live on farms and in suburbs. A few episodes take place in alternate but familiar settings, like an airport or a train station.

Broadcast and release 
The show premiered on PBS through PBS Kids in the United States in 2006 and Family Jr. in Canada in 2015. Season 10 premiered on PBS and the series made its debut on the PBS Kids 24/7 channel the same day. All seasons are available on Peacock and PBS Kids with the first 9 seasons exclusive to Peacock Premium and Hulu.

Curious George: A Very Monkey Christmas, an animated television film, was released on November 25, 2009. It was distributed by PBS and produced by Imagine Entertainment and Universal Animation Studios. The film is a holiday television special featuring George, as featured in the TV series, wondering what to give The Man in The Yellow Hat who is also wondering what to give George. It is shown every Christmas season on PBS Kids.

Awards
Emmy Award
2008 – Outstanding Children's Animated Program
2010 – Outstanding Children's Animated Program

References

External links
 

2000s American animated television series
2010s American animated television series
2020s American animated television series
2000s American children's comedy television series
2010s American children's comedy television series
2020s American children's comedy television series
2006 American television series debuts
2000s preschool education television series
2010s preschool education television series
2020s preschool education television series
American children's animated comedy television series
American preschool education television series
American television shows based on children's books
American television series with live action and animation
American television series revived after cancellation
Animated preschool education television series
Mathematics education television series
Daytime Emmy Award for Outstanding Animated Program winners
Curious George
English-language television shows
PBS original programming
PBS Kids shows
Peacock (streaming service) original programming
Peacock (streaming service) children's programming
Family Jr. original programming
Animated television shows based on films
Animated television series about monkeys
Animated television series about dogs
Animated television series about cats
Animated television series about squirrels
Television series by Universal Animation Studios
Television series by Imagine Entertainment
Television series by WGBH